Goheung County (Goheung-gun) is a county in Jeollanam-do Province, South Korea.

Naro Space Center
The Naro Space Center was completed during 2008 in southern Goheung  and is operated by the state-run Korea Aerospace Research Institute.  The space center includes a launch pad, a control tower, rocket assembly and test facilities, facilities for satellite control testing and assembly, a media center, an electric power station, a space experience hall (visitor center) and a landing field.

Modern history
On New Year's Day in 1963, some of the townships were classed from Bongrae-myeon to other myeons such as Dohwa-myeon, Podu-myeon and so on.
 
In 1973 and 1979, two of the townships were promoted to eups (towns)

Symbols
 City Tree : Citron tree
 County flower : Camellia blossom
 County bird : Dove

Location
Goheung is located in one of the southernmost areas of the Korean peninsula. It is surrounded by ocean on three sides with 19 inhabited islands and 152 uninhabited islands. The depth is not that low and its land spreads along the coast so many shellfish and seaweed industries have developed.

Climate

Twin towns – sister cities
Goheung is twinned with:

  Geumcheon-gu, South Korea
  Changwon, South Korea

See also
 Geography of South Korea
 Ssangchungsa
 Goheung Hyanggyo

External links
 County government home page

References

 
Counties of South Jeolla Province